The Hiram Smith Hall and Annex is part of the University of Wisconsin-Madison College of Agricultural and Life Sciences.

History
The hall and annex were built to hold what would be the first permanent dairy school found in the United States. Since then, the site has also been used for other subjects including soil science and agricultural journalism. Named for Hiram N. Smith, faculty that have taught at the hall and annex include Stephen Moulton Babcock and Harry Luman Russell.

The building was listed on the National Register of Historic Places in 1985 and on the State Register of Historic Places in 1989.

References

Further reading

External links

University and college buildings on the National Register of Historic Places in Wisconsin
National Register of Historic Places in Madison, Wisconsin
University of Wisconsin–Madison
Queen Anne architecture in Wisconsin
Brick buildings and structures